Juan Carlos Sconfianza (born 13 July 1943) is a retired Argentine football player.

Career
Sconfianza began his playing career with Argentine first division club San Lorenzo de Almagro. He made his professional debut against Independiente on 4 August 1963, and would make 109 league appearances for the club during a seven-year stay. While playing for San Lorenzo in a friendly tournament in Spain, representatives of Real Madrid observed Sconfianza, but never made an official approach for his services.

In 1971, Sconfianza moved abroad to play for Deportivo Toluca F.C. in the Primera División de México. One season later, he joined Puebla F.C. for four seasons, making 27 league appearances during the 1975–76 season.

Sconfianza was part of the Argentina squad at the 1964 Summer Olympics in Tokyo, but did not appear in any matches.

References

External links
Profile at BDFA.com.ar

Profile at Museodesanlorenzo.com.ar

1943 births
Living people
Argentine footballers
Olympic footballers of Argentina
Footballers at the 1964 Summer Olympics
San Lorenzo de Almagro footballers
Deportivo Toluca F.C. players
Club Puebla players
Argentine Primera División players
Liga MX players
Argentine expatriate footballers
Expatriate footballers in Mexico
Association football defenders
Footballers from Buenos Aires